The 8th International Emmy Awards took place on November 24, 1980, in New York City and was hosted by actor Peter Ustinov. The award ceremony, presented by the International Academy of Television Arts and Sciences (IATAS), honors all programming produced and originally aired outside the United States.

Ceremony 
The 8th International Emmys ceremony was presented by the International Academy of Television Arts and Sciences (IATAS). Twenty-one programs from seven countries competed for statuettes in four categories. England topped the list of nominees with five nominations, followed by Canada with two, and one from Belgium, France, Japan, the Netherlands and Switzerland, respectively. Producer Jim Henson was the first International Academy honoree with the Founders Award, and Lew Grade, head of England's Associate Communications, was chosen to receive the Directorate Award.

Winners

Best Drama
 A Rod of Iron (Great Britain: Yorkshire Television)

Best Documentary 
 Fighting Back (Canada: Canadian Broadcasting Corporation)

Best Performing Arts 
 L'Oiseau de Feu (Canada: Societe Radio-Canada)

Best Popular Arts Program 
 Not the Nine O'Clock News (Great Britain: British Broadcasting Corporation)

References 

International Emmy Awards ceremonies
International
International